Skumalasph Indian Reserve No. 16 is an Indian reserve of the Sto:lo people in the area of the City of Chilliwack, British Columbia, Canada.  Located six miles northwest of downtown Chilliwack and 468.40 ha. in area, it is jointly administered by five band governments, which are:
Aitchelitz First Nation
Kwaw-kwaw-Apilt First Nation
Skway First Nation
Skwah First Nation
Squiala First Nation

See also
List of Indian Reserves in Canada

References

Indian reserves in the Lower Mainland
Chilliwack
Sto:lo